Tatsuya Ito may refer to:

 Tatsuya Ito (politician) (born 1961), Japanese politician and minister
 Tatsuya Ito (footballer) (born 1997), Japanese footballer